Iveta Gerlová and Lucie Kriegsmannová were the defending champions, but both players chose not to participate.

Janette Husárová and Renata Voráčová won the tournament by defeating Jana Čepelová and Lenka Wienerová in the final, 7–6(7–2), 6–1.

Seeds

Draw

References 
 Main draw

Empire Trnava Cup - Doubles